Gilson Kleina (born 30 March 1968) is a Brazilian football coach, currently in charge of Portuguesa.

Managerial career
Born in Curitiba, Kleina started his career at Coritiba's youth setup, as a fitness coach. He later acted as Abel Braga's assistant at the same club, also having stints at Olympique de Marseille and Atléttico Mineiro. His first managerial experience occurred in 2001, with Vila Nova.

After another spell as Braga's assistant at Botafogo, Kleina took over Iraty in 2002, and subsequently was in charge of Criciúma, Paraná (three stints), Iraty, Caldense, Cianorte, Paysandu, Coruripe, Gama, Ipatinga, Caxias and Vila Nova.

On 27 August 2009, Kleina signed with Duque de Caxias Futebol Clube, as a replacement to Rodney Gonçalves. After stints at Boavista and Ipatinga, he returned to the club on 7 June 2010.

In November 2010, Kleina was appointed manager of Ponte Preta. He achieved promotion from the Série B in the end of the following year, taking the club to the main category after a six-year absence.

On 19 September 2012, Kleina was named Sociedade Esportiva Palmeiras manager, in the place of fired Luiz Felipe Scolari. Despite suffering relegation, he brought back the club to the first division as champions, but was still sacked on 8 May 2014.

On 13 August 2014, Kleina was appointed at the helm of Bahia, but resigned just three months later. The following 24 March, he was announced at Avaí.

On 11 December 2015, Kleina was presented at his first club Coritiba, now as first team manager. He left the club the following 2 June, and was named Goiás manager on 5 September.

On 23 March 2017, Kleina returned to Ponte Preta, but was relieved from his duties on 16 September. On 16 October, he was named Chapecoense manager.

Kleina was sacked by Chape on 6 August 2018, with the club seriously threatened with relegation. On 2 October, he returned to Ponte in the place of sacked Marcelo Chamusca, being sacked on 18 February 2020 after a poor start of the campaign.

On 15 August 2020, Kleina was announced manager of Náutico, replacing Gilmar Dal Pozzo. He returned to Ponte for a fifth spell on 28 May of the following year.

On 19 February 2022, after a 0–3 loss to rivals Guarani, Kleina was sacked, and returned to Chapecoense on 20 March. He was also dismissed from the latter on 5 July, after 16 matches.

Honours

Manager
Coruripe
Campeonato Alagoano: 2006

Palmeiras
Campeonato Brasileiro Série B: 2013

References

External links
 

1968 births
Sportspeople from Curitiba
Living people
Brazilian football managers
Campeonato Brasileiro Série A managers
Campeonato Brasileiro Série B managers
Brazilian people of German descent
Villa Nova Atlético Clube managers
Iraty Sport Club managers
Criciúma Esporte Clube managers
Paraná Clube managers
Paysandu Sport Club managers
Sociedade Esportiva do Gama managers 
Ipatinga Futebol Clube managers
Sociedade Esportiva e Recreativa Caxias do Sul managers
Vila Nova Futebol Clube managers
Duque de Caxias Futebol Clube managers
Boavista Sport Club managers
Associação Atlética Ponte Preta managers
Sociedade Esportiva Palmeiras managers
Esporte Clube Bahia managers
Avaí FC managers
Coritiba Foot Ball Club managers
Goiás Esporte Clube managers
Associação Chapecoense de Futebol managers
Clube Náutico Capibaribe managers
Brusque Futebol Clube managers
Associação Portuguesa de Desportos managers